The ZEN Vision W is a portable media player, developed by Creative Technology, and was released in September 2006.

Specifications

See also
 Comparison of portable media players
 Creative ZEN
 Creative Technology

References

External links
 Official product page
 epiZENter.net Unofficial fansite for ZEN players
 AnythingButiPod Zen Vision W Forum
 Upgrade Hard Drive Tutorial
 CreativeWizard PimpMyZen
 AnythingButiPod UMDF solution for problem installing MTP Device

Portable media players
Creative Technology products
Audiovisual introductions in 2006